Galtsjøen is a lake on the border of the municipalities of Rendalen and Engerdal in Innlandet county, Norway. The  lake is considered the headwaters of the river Femundselva which flows south into Sweden. The lake inlet is through the Galtstrømmen which comes from the small lake Galthåen which in turn has an inlet from the lake Isteren and Femund.

The lakes Galtsjøen and Galthåen are both part of the Galtsjøen nature reserve. The lake is rich in fish, including trout, grayling, whitefish, pike, burbot, and perch.

See also
List of lakes in Norway

References

Engerdal
Rendalen
Lakes of Innlandet